You Xiaozeng (January 1934 – 19 November 2016) was a Chinese inorganic chemist. He was an educator and an academician of the Chinese Academy of Sciences (CAS). You died on 19 November 2016 at the age of 83 in Nanjing.

References

1934 births
2016 deaths
Chemists from Jiangxi
Educators from Jiangxi
Members of the Chinese Academy of Sciences
Nanjing University alumni
Academic staff of Nanjing University
People from Ji'an